Guillaume-Antoine Olivier (19 January 1756, Les Arcs near Toulon – 1 October 1814, Lyon) was a French entomologist and naturalist.

Life
Olivier studied medicine in Montpellier, where he became good friends with Pierre Marie Auguste Broussonet. With Jean Guillaume Bruguière and Jean-Baptiste Lamarck, he collaborated in the creation of Journal d'Histoire Naturelle (1792). Afterwards, he served as a naturalist on a 6-year scientific journey that took him to Asia Minor, Persia, Egypt, Cyprus and Corfu. He returned to France in 1798 with a large collection of natural history specimens from his travels. Later, he was associated with the École nationale vétérinaire d'Alfort, where in 1811, he was appointed professor of zoology. Olivier was a close friend of Johan Christian Fabricius and a patron of Pierre André Latreille.

Although primarily an entomologist, Olivier also worked in the scientific field of herpetology, describing several new species of Asian lizards. He also described a few plant species, including Prunus arabica and Quercus libani.

Works

Olivier was the author of Coléoptères Paris Baudouin 1789–1808 (11 editions), Entomologie, ou histoire naturelle des Insectes (1808) and Le Voyage dans l'Empire Othoman, l'Égypte et la Perse (1807). He was a contributor to Encyclopédie Méthodique.

Legacy

Today, most of his collection is housed at the Museum National d'Histoire Naturelle in Paris.

A species of lizard, Mesalina olivieri, is named in his honor.

References

External links
Olivier GA (1800). Voyage dans l'empire Othoman, l'Égypte et la Perse, fait par ordre du gouvernement, pendant les six premières années de la république. Vol I - Vol II - [ Vol III] - [ Vol IV] - Vol V - Vol VI

1756 births
1814 deaths
Coleopterists
French entomologists
French carcinologists
French arachnologists
Scientists from Toulon
Members of the French Academy of Sciences
French expatriates in Iran
French expatriates in Turkey
French expatriates in Cyprus
French expatriates in Egypt
Travelers in Asia Minor